Eupithecia olivocostata is a moth in the  family Geometridae. It is found in Costa Rica.

References

Moths described in 1913
olivocostata
Moths of Central America